A referendum on the powers of the federal government to levy taxes on imports was held in the Federated States of Micronesia on 4 July 1995. Congress had adopted Public Law 8-135 on the matter, which would have altered article II of Chapter IX of the constitution. However, the move was vetoed by President Bailey Olter on 22 March. As a result, the referendum was held alongside by-elections for Congress. A three-quarter majority was required in three of the four states, but the proposal was rejected by voters.

References

1995 referendums
1995 in the Federated States of Micronesia
Referendums in the Federated States of Micronesia